Pavel Radoš (born 28 January 1991) is a professional Czech football player who currently plays for Vlašim.

Radoš joined Vlašim on loan from Dukla in January 2014 on a half-year loan. He then returned to Vlašim, this time on a season-long loan, in the summer of 2014.

References

External links

Living people
1991 births
Footballers from Prague
Czech footballers
FK Dukla Prague players
FC Silon Táborsko players
FC Sellier & Bellot Vlašim players

Association football defenders